Petar Miloševski Training Centre is a football multi-pitch complex in Skopje, North Macedonia. It is the official training centre of the Football Federation of North Macedonia (FFM). Originally, it was named as Training Centre FFM, but in 2014 it is renamed after the former football national team goalkeeper Petar Miloševski, who died in a car wreck earlier that year.

It is usually the home ground of the Macedonian national youth football teams. The seating capacity of the centre is 2,500 people.

References

Football venues in North Macedonia
Sport in Skopje
Petar Miloševski
National football academies